Trigger Run is a stream in the U.S. state of West Virginia.

Trigger Run was named from an incident when an early settler's gun trigger malfunctioned.

See also
List of rivers of West Virginia

References

Rivers of Monroe County, West Virginia
Rivers of West Virginia